The East Pauwasi languages are a family of Papuan languages spoken in north-central New Guinea, on both sides of the Indonesia-Papua New Guinea border. They may either form part of a larger Pauwasi language family along with the Western Pauwasi languages, or they could form an independent language family.

Languages
According to Timothy Usher, the East Pauwasi languages, which seem to form a dialect chain, are:

East Pauwasi River
Zorop (Yafi)
Emem–Karkar
Emem (Emumu)
North Emem
South Emem
Karkar (Yuri)

Usher also identified the Karkar (Yuri) language as Pauwasi.

Vocabulary comparison
The following basic vocabulary words are from Voorhoeve (1971, 1975), as cited in the Trans-New Guinea database:

{| class="wikitable sortable"
! Language !! Emem !! Zorop !! Tebi !! Towei
|-
! head
| yebikol || məndai || məndini || mindimna
|-
! hair
| yebipai || mepai || məndini-teke; məndini- teke || mindi-teke
|-
! ear
|  || waigi || faʔa || 
|-
! eye
| yu || dji; ji || ei; i || ei
|-
! nose
|  || məŋai || məndi || 
|-
! tooth
| jokol || djurai; jurai || kle || kəreser
|-
! tongue
|  || metaləp || klemalbo || 
|-
! leg
| puke || fu(ŋi) || puŋwa || popnoa
|-
! louse
| yemare || jemar; yemar || mi || 
|-
! dog
| ende || jendru; yendru ||  || 
|-
! pig
| fər || sər ||  || 
|-
! bird
| olmu || awe || lumu; olmu || yemu
|-
! egg
| yen || sen || alani; membi || jek
|-
! blood
| mobe || mob || teri; təri || edefi
|-
! bone
| kolk || əndai || gwane; gwano || pana
|-
! skin
| abe || fou; wu || ser || ser
|-
! breast
|  || muam || mamu || 
|-
! tree
| nare; walti || nare; war; wiŋgu || wejalgi; weyalgi || wemu
|-
! man
| yube || arab || toŋkwar || tokwar
|-
! woman
|  || elim || keke || 
|-
! sun
| yəmar || djəmar; jemar || maʔa || yimap
|-
! moon
|  || djunk || wuluma || 
|-
! water
| ende || djewek; yender || ai || eye
|-
! fire
| yau || dau; ju || we || we
|-
! stone
| yomei || andrur || kwola || mafi
|-
! road, path
|  || mai || fiaʔa || 
|-
! name
| ei || awei; djei; jei || kini || ken
|-
! eat
| fer || fel; fer || ne || nembra
|-
! one
| gərakam || aŋgətəwam; əŋətəwam || kərowali || giona
|-
! two
| anəŋgiar || anəŋgar || kre || krana
|}

Proto-language
Some lexical reconstructions of Proto-East Pauwasi by Usher (2020) are:

{| class="wikitable sortable"
! gloss !! Proto-East Pauwasi
|-
| head/hair || *mɛ
|-
| leaf/hair || *mbVwai
|-
| ear || *wVpi
|-
| eye || *ji
|-
| nose || *mɛi
|-
| seed/tooth || *jɔ
|-
| tongue || *mɜtaɺVp
|-
| foot/leg || *mbu
|-
| blood || *mɜp
|-
| bone || *ŋgVɺ
|-
| skin/bark || *apV, *jipi
|-
| breast || *mɵ̝m
|-
| louse || *jəmVɺ
|-
| pig || *pVɺ
|-
| bird || *and
|-
| egg || *jVn
|-
| tree || *naɺV, *waɺ
|-
| man/husband || *jɵ̝pɛ
|-
| woman || *VɺVm[i]
|-
| sun/sky || *jəmaɺ
|-
| moon || *juŋg
|-
| water || *Vnd
|-
| fire/wood || *jau
|-
| stone || *mbVɺi
|-
| path || *mVwai
|-
| name || *ɛi
|-
| eat/drink || *pɜɺ
|-
| one || *aŋgVtamb
|-
| two || *anVŋg
|}

References

External links

Pauwasi languages database at TransNewGuinea.org

 
Pauwasi languages